Jaelin Marie Howell (born November 21, 1999) is an American soccer player who plays as a midfielder for Racing Louisville FC. She has represented the United States at under-17 and under-20 level. In March 2017, she was called up to the senior national team for two international friendlies against Russia, and has since made three more appearances.

Early life
Howell attended Fossil Ridge High School in Fort Collins, Colorado. She was named an NSCAA All-American in 2015. She played for the  Florida State women's soccer team prior to beginning her professional career.

Howell was awarded the Hermann Trophy in 2020, honoring the United Soccer Coaches National Players of the Year in NCAA Division I women's soccer. She again won the Hermann Trophy in 2021 for the second consecutive season. On January 21, 2022, Howell signed a three-year contract with Racing Louisville FC after being selected second by the team in the 2022 NWSL Draft.

Club career 
Howell made her Racing Louisville debut on March 18 in the NWSL Challenge Cup opener, starting in midfield against the Kansas City Current.

International career
Howell was named to the 2016 CONCACAF Women's U-17 Championship Best XI. The same year, she was the starting center midfielder for the U-17 team at the 2016 FIFA U-17 Women's World Cup. On March 29, 2017, she was called up to the U.S. women's national soccer team.

After being a part of the USA U-20 Squad that finished runner up at the  2018 CONCACAF Women's U-20 Championship, Howell was named to the USA U-20 roster for the 2018 FIFA U-20 Women's World Cup.

She made her debut for the United States November 27, 2020, coming on as a substitute for Sam Mewis in the 89th minute against the Netherlands.

Howell scored her first senior national team goal in a 9–1 win over Uzbekistan.

Personal life
Jaelin's father, John, was an NFL safety who was part of the Tampa Bay Buccaneers team that won Super Bowl XXXVII.

Career statistics

International

Scores and results list United States's goal tally first, score column indicates score after each United States goal.

Honours 
Florida State Seminoles
 NCAA Division I Women's Soccer Championship: 2018, 2021

United States
 SheBelieves Cup: 2021; 2022

Individual
Hermann Trophy: 2020, 2021
Atlantic Coast Conference Midfielder of the Year: 2020, 2021

References

Match reports

External links
 
 
 U.S. Soccer player profile

1999 births
Living people
American women's soccer players
Soccer players from Colorado
People from Windsor, Colorado
United States women's under-20 international soccer players
United States women's international soccer players
Women's association football midfielders
Florida State Seminoles women's soccer players
Sportspeople from Fort Collins, Colorado
Racing Louisville FC players
National Women's Soccer League players
Racing Louisville FC draft picks